Sugar City is a Statutory Town in Crowley County, Colorado, United States. The population was 258 at the 2010 census.

A post office called Sugar City has been in operation since 1900.  The community was named for the fact it once was a sugar manufacturing center.

Geography
Sugar City is located in southeastern Crowley County at  (38.231866, -103.664851). Colorado State Highway 96 leads west  to Ordway, the county seat, and northeast  to Haswell.

Demographics

As of the census of 2000, there were 279 people, 117 households, and 78 families residing in the town. The racial makeup of the town was 88.89% White, 3.58% Native American, 1.08% Asian, 3.23% from other races, and 3.23% from two or more races. Hispanic or Latino of any race were 13.98% of the population.

There were 117 households, out of which 28.2% had children under the age of 18 living with them, 53.8% were married couples living together, 9.4% had a female householder with no husband present, and 33.3% were non-families. 28.2% of all households were made up of individuals, and 12.8% had someone living alone who was 65 years of age or older.  The average household size was 2.38 and the average family size was 2.97.

In the town, the population was spread out, with 26.2% under the age of 18, 5.0% from 18 to 24, 24.7% from 25 to 44, 25.4% from 45 to 64, and 18.6% who were 65 years of age or older.  The median age was 42 years. For every 100 females, there were 87.2 males.  For every 100 females age 18 and over, there were 85.6 males.

The median income for a household in the town was $25,208, and the median income for a family was $27,500. Males had a median income of $27,813 versus $18,750 for females. The per capita income for the town was $12,564.  About 12.9% of families and 19.6% of the population were below the poverty line, including 30.5% of those under the age of eighteen and 5.8% of those 65 or over.

History
Sugar City was named for its sugar beet factory, established in 1899. It was owned by the National Beet Sugar Company. During a drought in the 1950s the wastewater lagoons at the factory dried, producing a smell that overwhelmed the town. The factory closed in 1967.

See also

Outline of Colorado
Index of Colorado-related articles
State of Colorado
Colorado cities and towns
Colorado municipalities
Colorado counties
Crowley County, Colorado

References

External links
CDOT map of the Town of Sugar City

Towns in Crowley County, Colorado
Towns in Colorado